In molecular biology, snR64 is an RNA molecule belonging to the C/D class of small nucleolar RNA (snoRNA), which contain the C (UGAUGA) and  D (CUGA) box motifs. Similar to most members of the box C/D family, snR64 is conjectured to help direct site-specific 2'-O-methylation of substrate RNAs.

References

External links 
 

Small nuclear RNA